Ghazanfari (also Romanized as Ghaẕanfarī) is a village in Keybar Rural District, Jolgeh Zozan District, Khaf County, Razavi Khorasan Province, Iran. At the 2006 census, its population was 194, in 48 families.

References 

Populated places in Khaf County